2MASS 19281982-2640123 is a Sun-like star located in the area of Sagittarius constellation where the Wow! Signal is most widely believed to have originated. The star was identified in a 2022 paper as the most similar to the Sun out of the three solar analogs found inside the sky region. Located 1,800 light years away, it was estimated to be only 130 light years away from Claudio Maccone's estimation where a communicative civilization is most likely to exist.

The star has a right ascension of 19h 28m 19.8s, a declination of -26° 40' 12.59", an estimated temperature of 5,783 Kelvin, a radius of 0.99 solar radii, and a luminosity 1.0007 times that of the Sun. The team used the Gaia Archive to identify another dozen of candidates to be Sun-like stars, but the estimations on their luminosity were unknown.

Breakthrough listen search 
As a response to the discovery, on May 21, 2022 Breakthrough Listen conducted the first targeted search for the Wow! Signal to find its source. It also was its first collaboration between the Green Bank Telescope and the Allen Telescope Array (ATA) of the SETI Institute.

Greenbank performed two 30-minute observations, the ATA did six 5-minute observations with its new beam-former backend, and both observatories observed a total of 9 minutes and 40 seconds at the same time. The team used the turboSETI pipeline from 1–2 GHz to search for an artificial narrowband signal (2.79 Hz/1.91 Hz) with a drifting of ±4 Hz s−1. No technosignature candidates were reportedly found.

References 

Sagittarius (constellation)